The Third Person is the debut graphic novel and memoir of artist Emma Grove. Published on May 3, 2022 by Drawn & Quarterly, it tells the story of a woman who believes she is trans. She is about to go through the rigorous therapy prior to a sex change and discovers, through therapy,  she has, the trauma based disorder, dissociative identity disorder.

Reception 
Publishers Weekly praised Emma Grove's art style, saying that her "marvelously elastic, emotive art is reminiscent of Jules Feiffer." The reviewer also commented that, while most of the story happens in the same place, the memoir never becomes "visually dull." They concluded by saying that Grove's writing "draws readers into Emma’s world and makes them feel the complexities and contradictions of her experience." The Third Person was one of Publishers Weekly's Summer Reads staff pick for 2022.

Kirkus Reviews, which gave the novel a starred review, commented how, despite being 900 pages long, The Third Person is a "brisk reading experience" due to the "minimalist illustrations and powerful dialogue exchanges." They further note how Grove's talent at drawing the various facial expressions and movent done by the characters "embellishes the journey". Writing for the Library Journal, Tom Batten gave it a starred review and called Grove's novel "an unflinching exploration of how our identities are formed and maintained."

Brendan Buck, who reviewed for Newcity Lit, commented on the overall narrative of the book, noting that, while Grove's novel is quick to read, it's not easy, saying "it’s about untangling trauma toward a certain truth, but it’s also about the trauma created in the untangling." Talking about the drawings, Buck notes that, despite the simple art style, Grove is capable of differentiating the main character's various personalities with her "distinct character design".

The book has been longlisted for the 2023 Andrew Carnegie Medal for Excellence in Nonfiction.

References 

2022 graphic novels
2020s LGBT novels
Drawn & Quarterly titles
LGBT-related graphic novels
Novels with transgender themes
Transgender non-fiction books